Irwin Kra (born January 5, 1937) is an American mathematician, who works on the function theory in complex analysis.

Life and work 
Kra studied at Polytechnic Institute of Brooklyn (bachelor's degree in 1960) and at Columbia University, where he graduated in 1964 and received his doctorate in 1966 under supervision of Lipman Bers (Conformal Structure and Algebraic Structure). After that, he was from 1966 to 1968 a C.L.E. Moore instructor at Massachusetts Institute of Technology and then at the State University of New York at Stony Brook, where he chaired from 1975 to 1981 the Faculty of Mathematics. From 1991 to 1996, there, he was Dean of the Division of Physical Sciences and Mathematics. Since 2004 he has been Professor Emeritus. He was a visiting professor at the Hebrew University in Jerusalem (where he collaborated with Hershel M. Farkas), the University of Perugia in Santiago de Chile, the Tohoku University, the Fudan University in Shanghai (1987). From 2004 to 2008 he was Director of Math for America, a private organization that is dedicated to the improvement of college education in mathematics in the United States. He currently lives in New York City. In 2010 he taught at the Northwestern University.

From 1972 to 1973 he was a Guggenheim Fellow. In 2012 he became a fellow of the American Mathematical Society.

Kra studies Riemann surfaces and their moduli spaces (Teichmüller spaces) and their connection with Kleinian groups and associated automorphic forms and their applications for example in number theory.

With Bernard Maskit in 1998, he published the collected works of Lipman Bers on function theory.

Family relations
Irwin Kra has three children. He is the father of mathematician Bryna Kra, climate tech venture capitalist Gabriel Kra, and Douglas Kra.

Writings

Books
With Jane P. Gilman, Rubí E. Rodríguez Complex Analysis in the spirit of Lipman Bers, Springer Verlag, 2007
With Hershel M. Farkas Riemann Surfaces, Springer  Verlag, 1980, 2nd edn. August  1992
With Farkas: Theta constants, Riemann surfaces, and the modular group: an introduction with applications to uniformization theorems, partition identities and combinatorial number theory, Providence, American Mathematical Society 2001
With Lipman Bers (editors): Crash course on Kleinian Groups, Springer 1974
Automorphic forms and Kleinian Groups, Benjamin 1972
 Lipman Bers, a Life in Mathematics, Eds. I. Kra, R. Rodriguez, L. Keen, Amer. Math. Soc., Providence, RI, 2015.

Selected articles

with B. Maskit: 

with Hershel M. Farkas: 

with  C. J. Earle and S. L. Krushkal´:

References 

portrait on the sides of Math for America
The original article was a translation of the corresponding German article.

1937 births
Living people
20th-century American mathematicians
21st-century American mathematicians
Polytechnic Institute of New York University alumni
Columbia University alumni
Massachusetts Institute of Technology School of Science faculty
Stony Brook University faculty
Fellows of the American Mathematical Society